Zelyony Sad is a rural locality (a settlement) in Posyolok Nyzhny Baskunchak, Akhtubinsky District, Astrakhan Oblast, Russia. The population was 4 as of 2010.

Geography 
Zelyony Sad is located 72 km southeast of Akhtubinsk (the district's administrative centre) by road. Sredny Baskunchak is the nearest rural locality.

References 

Rural localities in Akhtubinsky District